Thomas Fey (born November 9, 1960) is a German orchestral conductor.

At the University of Music and Performing Arts Mannheim he studied music and conducting and at the Salzburg Mozarteum studied historically informed performance practice with Nikolaus Harnoncourt. He also attended master classes with Leonard Bernstein at the Schleswig-Holstein Music Festival. In 1985 while still a student he founded the Heidelberger Motetenchor and in 1987 the Schlierbach Chamber Orchestra, which in 1993 became the Heidelberger Sinfoniker (Heidelberg Symphony Orchestra) giving their inaugural concert on January 1, 1994. With the latter group, he began recording the complete symphonies of Joseph Haydn for the Hänssler Classic label.

In 2003 he founded the original instruments Ensemble La Passione and the Mozart Mannheim Orchestra.

In October 2014 Fey suffered a "severe traumatic brain injury". It was hoped that Fey would recover and be well enough to rejoin the orchestra at the beginning of 2016. However, as of 2018, it was unclear whether he would return to conducting.

References

External links
All Music biography by Robert Cummings

1960 births
Living people
21st-century German conductors (music)
German male conductors (music)
21st-century German male musicians